Peragrarchis is a genus of moths in the family Carposinidae.

Species
Peragrarchis emmilta Diakonoff, 1989
Peragrarchis martirea 
Peragrarchis minima Bradley, 1962
Peragrarchis pelograpta (Meyrick, 1929) (originally in Meridarchis)
Peragrarchis rodea (Diakonoff, 1950) (originally in Meridarchis)
Peragrarchis syncolleta (Meyrick, 1928) (originally in Meridarchis)

References

Natural History Museum Lepidoptera generic names catalog

Carposinidae